K. V. Gopalaswamy (or Kurma Venu Gopalaswamy) (Telugu: కూర్మా వేణు గోపాలస్వామి) (1903–1983) was an advocate, playwright and administrator in India. He was the first professor of law in Andhra University and the first honorary professor of theatre arts  and chairman of the Faculty of Arts.

He was born on 19 December 1903. He was the son of Sir Kurma Venkata Reddy Naidu, the former governor of Madras Presidency. He has one sister. He did Bar-at-Law. He was educated at the Oxford Balliol College, where he did his master's degree. He was later called to the Bar of the Inner temple of United Kingdom.

He was the private secretary to the Agent General of India in South Africa in 1930. He came back to India to serve in Andhra University and was appointed as the registrar, a post he held till his retirement for about 22 years (April 1942 to February 1964). Andhra University was inaugurated in temporary premises at Bezawada in 1926 by Lord Goschen, the first chancellor. Goschen was the governor of Madras Presidency from April 1924 to June 1929. He was succeeded by Lord Erskine, who was in the chair up to March 1940 except for a brief interregnum from 18 June 1936 to 01 October 1936. During this period Kurma Venkata Reddy Naidu was the governor and ex-officio chancellor of Andhra University. Reddy Naidu was also the chief minister of the state for a little over three months in 1937. In April 1942, his son Kurma Venugopalaswamy was appointed the registrar of Andhra University, which post he held till his retirement in February 1964. Thus a father and son occupied high positions associated with the Andhra University, a rare phenomenon in the annals of this university. The younger Kurma took active interest in amateur theatre, and it was due to his efforts that the Department of Theatre Arts was established. The open-air theatre known to earlier batches of students as Erskine Square is now named after him – Kurma Venugopalaswamy Arubayalu Rangasthalam, a name as lengthy as the tenure of his office of the registrar of Andhra Vishwa Kala Parishat.

After retirement he held the position of director of the Indian Institute of Management and Commerce, Hyderabad in 1973 until 1978.

He played hockey and tennis and was the captain of the Madras Christian College Lawn Tennis Association. He played hockey against many international teams and had the proud privilege of partnering the late Shri Fakhruddin Ali Ahmed in an international tennis tournament in France.

His birth centenary celebrations were organised by a committee headed by the AU vice-chancellor, Y.C. Simhadri. They were inaugurated on 19 December 2003, and concluded with the valedictory on 29 January 2004. A souvenir was released with contributory articles from his students and beneficiaries.

He was awarded an honorary doctorate (D.Litt.) by Andhra University in recognition of his services and intellectual contributions on the occasion of the fiftieth convocation in 1977.

Andhra University Open-Air Theatre was named after him by the university authorities as a token of gratitude.

Prof. K.V. Gopalaswamy Memorial All India Playlets Competitions were organized annually.

He died in 1983.

Publications
 Intermediate Rangasthala Sastramu.

References

Telugu people
1903 births
1983 deaths
20th-century Indian lawyers
Academic staff of Andhra University